Terra Nova is a provincial electoral district for the House of Assembly of Newfoundland and Labrador, Canada. As of 2011 there were 8,425 eligible voters within the district.

The central Newfoundland district is found on the western shore of Bonavista Bay and Trinity Bay though it excludes the Bonavista Peninsula and includes the national park of same name. While farming and fishing have been traditional mainstays of the economy, tourism has become increasingly popular.

The largest community in this district is Clarenville. It also includes communities on Bonavista Bay from Glovertown south to Port Blandford and the Trinity Bay communities between Clarenville and Southport while it also includes St. Brendan's and Random Island.

Members of the House of Assembly
The district has elected the following Members of the House of Assembly:

Election results

References

External links 
Website of the Newfoundland and Labrador House of Assembly

Newfoundland and Labrador provincial electoral districts